Lomna may refer to:
 Lomná, Námestovo, a village in the Žilina Region of Slovakia
 Lomná (river) (also known as Lomňanka), a tributary of the Olza River, Czech Republic
 Dolní Lomná, a village in the Moravian-Silesian Region of the Czech Republic
 Horní Lomná, a village in the Moravian-Silesian Region of the Czech Republic
 Łomna, Lesser Poland Voivodeship, a village in southern Poland
 Łomna, Nowy Dwór Mazowiecki County, a village in Masovian Voivodeship, Poland
 Łomna, Sokołów County, a village in Masovian Voivodeship, Poland
 Łomna, Subcarpathian Voivodeship, a village in south-eastern Poland